Foxhall is a rural hamlet of a few houses between Hill Mountain and Port Lion in the community of Llangwm, and the parish of Burton, Pembrokeshire, Wales.

References

Villages in Pembrokeshire